Sir Richard Edgcumbe (circa 1570 – 23 March 1639) of Mount Edgcumbe and of Cotehele in the parish of Calstock, both in Cornwall, was an English politician who sat in the House of Commons at various times between 1586 and 1629.

Origins
He was the eldest son and heir of Peter Edgcumbe of Mount Edgcumbe and Cotehele, Lord Lieutenant of Cornwall and a Member of Parliament by his wife Margaret Luttrell, a daughter of Sir Andrew Luttrell, feudal baron of Dunster, of Dunster Castle in Somerset.

Career
He was a student of Middle Temple in 1585. In 1586, Edgcumbe was elected Member of Parliament (MP) for Liskeard while his father was steward of the town. In 1589, he was elected MP for Totnes. He was elected MP for Grampound in 1593. He was knighted in 1603 and succeeded to the estates on the death of his father in 1608. In 1614, he was elected MP for Bodmin in the Addled Parliament. He was elected MP for Grampound again in 1624 for the Happy Parliament. In 1628, he was elected MP for Bossiney and sat until 1629, when King Charles decided to rule without parliament for eleven years.

Marriages and children
He married twice:
Firstly, in 1602, to Anne Carey, a daughter of Sir George Carey (c. 1541-1616) of Cockington in the parish of Tor Mohun in Devon, Lord Deputy of Ireland, without issue; 
Secondly, in 1608, he married Mary Coteele, daughter of Sir Thomas Coteele of London, by whom he had three sons including:
Piers Edgcumbe.

Death and burial
Edgcumbe died on 23 March 1639 at the age of about 68.

References

 
 
 
 

1570s births
1639 deaths
English MPs 1586–1587
English MPs 1589
English MPs 1593
English MPs 1614
English MPs 1624–1625
English MPs 1628–1629
English knights
Knights Bachelor
Members of the Parliament of England (pre-1707) for Totnes
Members of the Parliament of England (pre-1707) for Liskeard
Members of the Parliament of England for Grampound
Members of the Parliament of England for Bodmin
Members of the Parliament of England for Bossiney